The 2020 Men's Water Polo Olympic Qualification Tournament took place from 14 to 21 February 2021 in Rotterdam, Netherlands. The top three teams advanced to the Olympics.

The tournament was scheduled to take place from 22 to 29 March and then from 31 May to 7 June 2020, but was postponed due to the COVID-19 pandemic.

Due to their semifinal wins, both Montenegro and Greece qualified for the Olympics. Croatia followed by winning the third place game.

Participants

Draw
The draw took place on 11 February 2020 in Lausanne, Switzerland.

1 Argentina withdrew from the tournament in mid-February. FINA replaced the South-American team with Romania

Preliminary round
All times are local (UTC+1).

Group A

Group B

Knockout stage

Bracket

Fifth place bracket

Quarterfinals

5–8th place semifinals

Semifinals

Seventh place game

Fifth place game

Third place game

Final

Final ranking

See also
2020 Women's Water Polo Olympic Qualification Tournament

References

External links
Official website
FINA website
Results
Results book

Water Polo
Olympic
Water polo
Water Polo, Men's, Olympic Qualification Tournament, 2020
Men's Water Polo Olympic Qualification Tournament
Sports competitions in Rotterdam